Walter Andrew Foery (July 6, 1890 – May 10, 1978) was an American prelate of the Roman Catholic Church. He served as Bishop of Syracuse from 1937 to 1970.

Biography
Walter Foery was born in Rochester, New York, to William and Agnes (née O'Brien) Foery. After attending St. Bridget's Grade School and St. Andrew's Preparatory Seminary, he studied at St. Bernard's Seminary. He was ordained to the priesthood on June 10, 1916. He then served as a curate (1916–1922) and afterwards pastor (1922–1932) of Our Lady of Mount Carmel Church in Rochester. He became diocesan director of Catholic Charities in 1930 and pastor of Holy Rosary Church in 1932. He also served as vice-chairman of the Rochester Council of Social Agencies, and represented the National Catholic Welfare Council at the International Conference on Social Welfare in 1936.

On May 26, 1937, Foery was appointed the fifth Bishop of Syracuse by Pope Pius XI. He received his episcopal consecration on the following August 18 from Archbishop Edward Mooney, with Bishops Emmet M. Walsh and Francis Patrick Keough serving as co-consecrators. At age 46, he was the youngest priest appointed to head the Syracuse diocese, and would become its longest-serving Ordinary to date.

In 1945, Foery criticized as "unthinkable" the plan to leave out opening prayers at the San Francisco conference of the United Nations. In 1959, he expressed "shock and deep regret" that the Syracuse Metropolitan Health Council had admitted Planned Parenthood. He was named an Assistant at the Pontifical Throne on December 11, 1961. He attended all four sessions of the Second Vatican Council in Rome between 1962 and 1965. In 1967, he joined the other Catholic bishops in New York to call Catholics to fight with "all their power" against efforts to liberalize state abortion law.

Foery retired as Bishop on August 4, 1970, after nearly thirty-three years of service. On that same date, he was named Titular Bishop of Misenum, a post which he later resigned on the following December 31. He died at the age of 87, and is buried at St. Mary's Cemetery in DeWitt. Le Moyne College, a Jesuit college in Syracuse, houses an upperclassman dormitory -- Foery Hall—named after the former Bishop.

References

External links
Diocese of Syracuse 

1890 births
1978 deaths
Religious leaders from Rochester, New York
Participants in the Second Vatican Council
Roman Catholic bishops of Syracuse
20th-century Roman Catholic bishops in the United States